Sam McKenzie (born October 26, 1965) is an American politician serving as a member of the Tennessee House of Representatives from the 15th district. He assumed office on January 12, 2021.

Early life and education 
McKenzie was born in Knoxville, Tennessee. After graduating from Austin-East High School earned a Bachelor of Science degree in Fisk University and a Master of Science in physics from the University of Memphis.

Career 
Prior to entering politics, McKenzie worked as a scientist at the Oak Ridge National Laboratory, where he managed maintenance on the Spallation Neutron Source. He was elected to the Tennessee House of Representatives on November 3, 2020, succeeding incumbent Democrat Rick Staples.

Personal life 
McKenzie has older twin brothers, Raleigh McKenzie and Reggie McKenzie, who both played in the NFL.

References 

1965 births
Living people
People from Knoxville, Tennessee
Politicians from Knoxville, Tennessee
Fisk University alumni
University of Memphis alumni
Democratic Party members of the Tennessee House of Representatives
Oak Ridge National Laboratory people
African-American state legislators in Tennessee
21st-century African-American people
20th-century African-American people